The ATP Challenger Tour Finals was a tennis tournament played between 2011 and 2015 at the end of season, involving the top seven players in that year's ATP Challenger Tour, plus an invited player from the tournament's host country.

Like the ATP Finals, the ATP Challenger Tour Finals was not a straightforward knockout tournament. Eight players were divided into two groups of four, and played three round-robin matches each against the other three players in their group. From there, the two players with the best records in each group progressed to the semifinals, with the winners meeting in the final to determine the champion.

Venues

Past finals

Singles

See also
 ATP Finals
 WTA Tour Championships
 WCT Finals
 WCT World Doubles
 World Championship Tennis
 Grand Prix tennis circuit

References

External links
Official Website

 
Finals
Tennis tournaments in Brazil
Sport in São Paulo
2011 establishments in Brazil
Recurring sporting events established in 2011
2015 disestablishments in Brazil
Recurring sporting events disestablished in 2015